Parliamentary elections were held in Montenegro on 11 January 1914. These were the last parliamentary elections in the Kingdom of Montenegro, which was abolished and annexed to Serbia in November 1918.

Overview
The People's Party, which had been banned for more than seven years, won the election with the platform of unification of Montenegro with Serbia, whilst the governing True People's Party won just four elected seats.

The "Working Bloc coalition" led by the People's Party, which won an absolute majority of votes and 25 MPs, formed a parliamentary majority of 44 seats in alliance with the "Mijuškovićko-Jabučka grupa" (former members of the True People's Party rallied around a former party leader Lazar Mijušković), which won 17 seats, and Marko Daković's "Unified Serb Youth" list (2 seats).

Results

Aftermath
After the election, Army General Janko Vukotić remains in office as Prime Minister, this time with the support of a new parliamentary majority, which becomes part of his new cabinet, which lasted until 16 July 1915 and Vukotić resignation.

At the end of December 1915, Lazar Mijušković succeed to arrange for the formation of a new government, which was formed in early January 1916, just a two weeks before the Montenegrin capitulation in World War I, the cabinet continued in exile.

References

Elections in Montenegro
Montenegro
Parliamentary
Montenegro